Clans of Intrigue is a 1977 Hong Kong wuxia film adapted from Fragrance in the Sea of Blood of Gu Long's Chu Liuxiang novel series. The film was directed by Chor Yuen, produced by the Shaw Brothers Studio, and starred Ti Lung as the lead character. It was followed by Legend of the Bat (1978) and Perils of the Sentimental Swordsman (1982).
There's a 1993 Hong Kong movie of the same genre and title directed by Chan Muk Chuen and starred Mang Fei and Yang Guan Guan..

Plot
Chu Liuxiang is having drinks with his friend, Monk Wuhua. Gong Nanyan of the Holy Water Palace suddenly appears and accuses Chu of having stolen the palace's Heaven's One Holy Water and committed a series of murders. She agrees to give Chu a month's time to clear his name, or else the mistress of the palace will kill him. Chu's curiosity and eagerness to prove his innocence spur him to investigate the case.

Cast
Ti Lung as Chu Liuxiang
Elliot Ngok as Monk Wuhua
Lee Ching as Black Pearl
Nora Miao as Gong Nanyan
Betty Pei as Shuimu Yinji
Ling Yun as Zhongyuan Yidianhong
Tin Ching as Nangong Lin
Nancy Yen as Qiu Lingsu
Chan Si-gai as Su Rongrong
Lau Wai-ling as Li Hongxiu
Chong Lee as Song Tian'er
Ku Feng as Leng Qiuhun
Ku Wen-chung as Abbot Tianfeng
Cheng Miu as Sun Xuepu
Norman Chui as Song Gang
Yuen Wah as Iga Ninja
Keung Hon
Ku Kuan-chung
Chan Shen
Teresa Ha
Yeung Chi-hing
Shum Lo
Wong Ching-ho
Ng Hong-sang
Liu Wai
Lee Sau-kei
Siu Kam
Ngai Fei
Leung Seung-wan
Corey Yuen
Wong Pau-gei
Lee Hang
Yuen Cheung-yan
Chui Fat
Tang Tak-cheung
Hsu Hsia
Wong Chi-keung
San Kuai
Alan Chan
Ting Tung
Ng Yuen-fan
Hung Ling-ling
Lui Hung
Cheung Chok-chow
Mama Hung
Wang Han-chen
Chin Chun
Cheung Sek-au
Cheung Hei
Gam Tin-chue
Tsang Chor-lam
Brandy Yuen
Kong Chuen
Man Man

External links

1977 films
1977 martial arts films
Wuxia films
Hong Kong martial arts films
Hong Kong action thriller films
1970s action thriller films
1970s mystery films
Shaw Brothers Studio films
Mandarin-language films
Works based on Chu Liuxiang (novel series)
Lesbian-related films
Films directed by Chor Yuen
Films based on works by Gu Long
1970s Hong Kong films